David Brink may refer to:

 David Brink (businessman) (born 1939), South African businessman
 David Brink (cyclist) (1947–2019), American cyclist
 David O. Brink (born 1958), American philosopher
 David R. Brink (1919–2017), American attorney